Samuel Willard Bridgham (May 4, 1774 – December 28, 1840) was the first mayor of Providence, Rhode Island.

Early life
Bridgham was born on May 4, 1774, in Seekonk, Massachusetts.  He graduated from Brown University with the class of 1794, at the age of twenty.

Career
Bridgham became a lawyer before entering politics.  He served nineteen terms in the Rhode Island General Assembly, two of those as the Speaker.  He also served as Attorney General of Rhode Island for four years. Bridgham stood as the Federalist candidate in the 1821 Rhode Island gubernatorial election, but lost to William C. Gibbs. When Providence was incorporated as a city in 1832, he was elected its first Mayor. He served in that office until his death in 1840, at the age of 66. Bridgham became the first mayor of Providence at a time when disorder and vice threatened the city.  His solutions were free public education, temperance, and relief for the poor. He laid down foundations for good municipal government in Providence and served during one of the city's most significant expansions of the public school system.

Outside politics in 1821 he was elected Trustee of Brown University. He served as Brown's Chancellor from 1828 to 1840. For nineteen years he was the President of the Benevolent Congregational Society in Providence. Bridgham was elected a member of the American Antiquarian Society in 1813.

Personal life

In 1798, he married Elizabeth Paine (1776–1853). Together, they were the parents of six children: 

 Elizabeth W. Bridgham (1799–1882), who married William Samuel Patten (1800–1873) in 1827.
 Abby C. Bridgham (1803–1840), who married Edward Little of New York in 1831.
 Samuel Fales Bridgham (1805–1807), who died young.
 Julia Bowen Bridgham (1810–1874), who married George Curtis, president of Continental National Bank of New York.
 Samuel Willard Bridgham (1813–1870), who married his second cousin Eliza Ann Fales (1813–1895) in 1839.
 Joseph Bridgham (1815–1865), a lawyer and United States Commissioner in New York City.

Bridgham died on December 28, 1840, in Providence and was buried in the North Burial Ground.

Descendants
In 1869, Bridgham's grandson Samuel Willard Bridgham (1842–1915), married Fanny Schermerhorn (1846–1919), a niece of Caroline Schermerhorn Astor, who was known as the "Mrs. Astor" and was the leader of New York society during the Gilded Age.

References

External links

|-

1774 births
1840 deaths
Brown University alumni
Mayors of Providence, Rhode Island
Members of the American Antiquarian Society
Chancellors of Brown University
Speakers of the Rhode Island House of Representatives
People from Seekonk, Massachusetts
People of colonial Massachusetts
Burials at North Burying Ground (Providence)